Diario Rio Negro is an Argentine daily newspaper edited in General Roca, and published in the provinces of Río Negro, Neuquén, the south of La Pampa, the north of Chubut, the south of Buenos Aires Province and the City of Buenos Aires.

History 

The Rio Negro was founded on May 1, 1912 by Fernando Emilio Rajneri. At first the newspaper was published fortnightly but later weekly. Since 1958 the newspaper has circulated as a daily. An on-line version has been available since August 5, 1997.

The current chief executive of the newspaper, Julio Rajneri, is a son of the founder, and a former national Minister of Education, who served during Alfonsín's term of office.

Style 
Since its foundation, the newspaper has been very reader-focused. Its articles mostly address local and regional affairs. It was one of the few publications to criticise the military government (1976–1983), when it published articles about the kidnappings and other violations of human rights during that period.

References 
Julio Rajneri 
Río Negro Staff 

Newspapers established in 1912
Daily newspapers published in Argentina
1912 establishments in Argentina
Spanish-language newspapers
Argentine news websites